The 1967 Prize of Moscow News was the second edition of an international figure skating competition organized in Moscow, Soviet Union. It was held December 14–17, 1967. Medals were awarded in the disciplines of men's singles, ladies' singles, pair skating and ice dancing. Czechoslovakia's Marian Filc defeated the Soviet Union's Sergey Volkov and Alexander Vedenin for the men's title. Hungary's Zsuzsa Almássy won gold in the ladies' event, ahead of Soviets Elena Shcheglova and Galina Grzhibovskaya. The Soviet Union swept the pairs' podium, led by Irina Rodnina / Alexei Ulanov. Irina Grishkova / Viktor Ryzhkin won the ice dancing title ahead of his former partner, Liudmila Pakhomova, and Alexander Gorshkov.

Men

Ladies

Pairs

Ice dancing

References

1967 in figure skating
Prize of Moscow News